Vex is an album by the English reggae band Steel Pulse, released in 1994. The band added dancehall sounds to its traditional reggae. The band promoted the album with a North American tour.

The album peaked at No. 7 on the Billboard Top Reggae Albums chart.

Production
The album was produced by the band and Stephen Stewart. "New World Order" criticizes the Clinton administration. "No Justice, No Peace" was inspired by the 1992 Los Angeles riots. Tony Rebel contributed to "Bootstraps".

Critical reception

The Edmonton Journal noted the "gentler ... smoothed-out sound." The Chicago Tribune deemed the album "equal parts love songs and personal, social and political manifestos," writing that "luckily, even the topical material is eminently groovable." The Gazette wrote that "lead vocalist David Hinds has one of the most expressive reggae voices around and his band is as tight as a fist." The Indianapolis Star stated that "Vex finds Steel Pulse succeeding in delivering tough messages in an accessible musical framework."

Track listing
"Bootstraps" – 4:48
"Back to My Roots" – 4:59
"Islands Unite" – 4:20
"Better Days" – 4:50
"In My Life" – 4:36
"Endangered Species" – 4:34
"New World Order" – 4:30
"X Resurrection" – 4:34
"Whirlwind Romance" – 4:56
"No Justice, No Peace" – 4:43
"Dirty H2O" – 4:19
"Dub to My Roots" – 4:58
"Dubite" – 4:18

References

Steel Pulse albums
1994 albums
MCA Records albums